Eric Bodine (born August 17, 1962) is an American professional stock car racing driver. He drove a total of 78 races in the NASCAR Busch North Series (now the ARCA Menards Series East) in the mid and late 1990s, where he ran nearly full seasons. In addition, he made one start in the Busch Series at his home track of Watkins Glen in 1998. He is part of NASCAR's Bodine family as the uncle of Barry and cousin of Geoff, Brett, and Todd Bodine.

Racing career

Motorsports career results

NASCAR
(key) (Bold – Pole position awarded by qualifying time. Italics – Pole position earned by points standings or practice time. * – Most laps led.)

Busch Series

Busch North Series

References

External links
 
 Official website

1962 births
NASCAR drivers
Living people
Racing drivers from New York (state)
People from Franklin County, New York
Bodine family